Croydon was a constituency in the House of Commons of the UK Parliament from 1885 to 1918. As with most in its lifetime following the Redistribution of Seats Act 1885, it was a seat, that elected one Member of Parliament (MP) by the first past the post system of election.

It was won for all but three years by the Conservative candidate, the exception being the years 1906-1909 when that party, as a fellow Unionist party against Irish Home Rule and other devolution in a spell of widespread popular decline held a general meeting endorsing instead H. O. Arnold-Forster, a Liberal Unionist.  His 3.2% victory against the candidate of the rest of the Liberal Party coupled with a 20.2% performance for Labour in Croydon which coincided with a Liberal landslide — the First Asquith ministry which brought in the fundamental constitutional reform of the Parliament Act 1911 after the delay for "the People's Budget" to be implemented.  He died in 1909 causing a by-election and his party, with its occasional candidates in the region, no longer stood for the Croydon seat nor its north–south successors after 1918.  The Labour party fielded a candidate for the second time in the 1909 by-election, polling badly, winning about a fifth of the 1906 vote; the party fielded none in the 1910 elections for this seat.

Boundaries 
1885–1918: The municipal borough of Croydon.

This seat was covered an area based on the town of Croydon. Croydon had been a Municipal Borough from 1883 and was to become a County Borough in 1889. By 1902, at the latest, the parliamentary and local government boroughs had the same boundaries.

The Royal Commission on London Traffic, which reported in 1906, included the borough in its definition of Greater London. It was throughout in the north-east of Surrey. Its area has been included in Greater London since 1965.

From 1918 Croydon was divided into two borough constituencies - Croydon North and Croydon South.

History 

The constituency was close enough to London and built-up enough to be considered part of a greater London or "Metropolitan" area.

A large part of the inhabitants of this constituency commuted to work in the City of London. It was however an area where attendance at Nonconformist chapels exceeded that at Anglican churches, according to the Daily News survey of 1902. By the time of the 1911 census more factories had been set up and a large artisan population had moved in so its core and north in particular was decidedly lower-income working-class.

The constituency was in general Conservative, but less strongly so than many suburban commuter seats around London. The Labour Party secured 20% of the vote, in a three-way contest, in the 1906 election.

Borough rather than a County seat
The seat being a parliamentary borough made for a lower level of election expenses permissible and the usual office/status for the returning officer.

Members of Parliament

Election results

Elections in the 1880s 

Grantham resigned after being appointed a judge of the Queen's Bench Division of the High Court of Justice, causing a by-election.

Herbert was appointed a Lord Commissioner of the Treasury, requiring a by-election.

Elections in the 1890s 

Herbert's succession to the peerage causes a by-election.

Ritchie's appointment as President of the Board of Trade causes a by-election.

Elections in the 1900s

Elections in the 1910s 

General Election 1914–15:

Another General Election was required to take place before the end of 1915. The political parties had been making preparations for an election to take place and by July 1914, the following candidates had been selected; 
Unionist: Ian Malcolm
Liberal:

See also
List of former United Kingdom Parliament constituencies

References

Notes

 Boundaries of Parliamentary Constituencies 1885-1972, compiled and edited by F.W.S. Craig (Parliamentary Reference Publications 1972)
 British Parliamentary Election Results 1885-1918, compiled and edited by F.W.S. Craig (Macmillan Press 1974)
 Social Geography of British Elections 1885-1910. by Henry Pelling (Macmillan 1967)
 Who's Who of British Members of Parliament, Volume II 1886-1918, edited by M. Stenton and S. Lees (Harvester Press 1978)
 Who's Who of British Members of Parliament, Volume III 1919-1945, edited by M. Stenton and S. Lees (Harvester Press 1979)
 

Politics of the London Borough of Croydon
Parliamentary constituencies in London (historic)
Parliamentary constituencies in South East England (historic)
Constituencies of the Parliament of the United Kingdom established in 1885
Constituencies of the Parliament of the United Kingdom disestablished in 1918